Sweden sent 112 athletes to the 2006 Winter Olympics in Turin trying to win their first gold medal since the 1994 Olympics in Lillehammer. A total of 99 athletes were selected, and they competed in nine of the fifteen Winter Olympic sports. When the medals were summed up, Sweden had managed seven gold medals, two silver and five bronze, making it Sweden's best result ever in the Winter Olympics in terms of both medals and gold medals earned, and gave Sweden a 6th place in the medal table.

Sweden won gold medals in five different Winter Olympic sports, shattering the previous record of two.

Medalists
The following Swedish athletes won medals at the games:

Alpine skiing

2004 and 2005 World Cup overall champion Anja Pärson won bronze medals in the women's combined and downhill, before claiming her first Olympic gold medal in the slalom. Anna Ottosson also earned a medal, winning the second run in the women's giant slalom to claim bronze.

Men

Women

Note: In the men's combined, run 1 is the downhill, and runs 2 and 3 are the slalom. In the women's combined, run 1 and 2 are the slalom, and run 3 the downhill.

Biathlon 

Anna Carin Olofsson, who had switched from cross-country skiing to biathlon just four years earlier, became the first Swedish woman to win a gold medal in biathlon. Olofsson also won a silver in the sprint event. The men's relay team fell short of a medal in a photo finish, having greatly hurt their chances by missing 12 shots.

Cross-country skiing 

A total of fifteen athletes – ten men and five women – were selected, making the cross-country squad the largest excluding the ice hockey teams.

Emelie Öhrstig was the defending World Champion at the women's sprint event, but that was in classical style, and she failed to make the final in Turin. Björn Lind, leader of the men's cross-country World Cup in sprint, was more successful, winning the gold medal and then pairing with bronze medalist Thobias Fredriksson to win the team sprint event as well.

The women's sprint team of Lina Andersson and Anna Dahlberg joined their male counterparts in winning gold, while the men's 4 × 10 km relay claimed the only Swedish medal from a distance event, a bronze.

Distance

Men

Women

Sprint

Curling 

Summary

In the men's event, three-time World champion Peja Lindholm had a strong start, opening the tournament 3–0, including a win over eventual gold-medalists Canada, but fell off as the week continued, losing six consecutive games to finish out of the medal round.

On the women's side, Anette Norberg, the 2005 World champion, and a six-time European champion, led her team to the top spot in the round robin. The Swedes then survived a close game with Norway in the semifinal, winning with a single point in the final end. In the gold medal game, Norberg's rink had a comfortable lead, but saw Switzerland storm back to tie and force an extra end. In that extra, Norberg converted a difficult double takeout to win the gold medal.

Men's

Team: Peja Lindholm (skip), Tomas Nordin, Magnus Swartling, Peter Narup, Anders Kraupp (alternate)

Round-robin
Draw 1

Draw 2

Draw 3

Draw 4

Draw 6

Draw 7

Draw 8

Draw 10

Draw 11

Standings

Women's

: Anette Norberg (skip), Eva Lund, Cathrine Lindahl, Anna Svärd, Ulrika Bergman  (alternate) 

Round-robin
Draw 1

Draw 2

Draw 4

Draw 5

Draw 6

Draw 7

Draw 8

Draw 9

Draw 11

Standings

Playoffs
Semifinal

Final

Key: The hammer indicates which team had the last stone in the first end.

Figure skating 

Kristoffer Berntsson, the lone Swedish figure skater in Turin, finished 23rd in the men's event.

Key: CD = Compulsory Dance, FD = Free Dance, FS = Free Skate, OD = Original Dance, SP = Short Program

Freestyle skiing 

Four moguls skiers represented Sweden in the freestyle disciplines, with the best finish coming from Sara Kjellin in the women's event. Kjellin sat in bronze medal position with only a single skier to come, but that skier was eventual winner Jennifer Heil, leaving Kjellin just short of a medal.

Ice hockey 

Summary

The Swedish men's team suffered an early setback when it lost 5–0 to Russia, but wins over Kazakhstan, Latvia and the United States meant that the team was guaranteed a quarterfinal spot entering the final round-robin game with Slovakia. This game stirred up controversy, with head coach Bengt-Åke Gustafsson suggesting that the team might not play for a win, in order to set up a quarterfinal matchup with underdog Switzerland. Ultimately, the Swedes did lose the game, though the IIHF supervisor "didn't see anything special". The team then picked up comfortable wins in the medal round, beating the Swiss 5–2 and the Czech Republic 7–3, setting up a gold medal final with local rivals Finland. The Swedes fell behind after the first period, but a pair of goals in the second left the game tied going into the final 20 minutes. Nicklas Lidström then scored early in the third, giving the Swedes a 3–2 lead that would hold, and giving the country its first Olympic hockey title since 1994. Thousands of fans greeted the victorious team upon their return from Turin, with many of the NHL players stopping in Stockholm before returning to their club teams.

The women's team managed to advance to the medal round in the Olympic tournament, but an 8–1 loss to Canada only seemed to enhance the perception that women's hockey had few competitive teams. In the semifinals, the Swedes faced the United States, and fell behind 2–0 early in the second period. However, the Swedes then rallied, scoring twice to tie the game, and shut down the favoured Americans, forcing a shootout to decide the game. Swedish goaltender Kim Martin stopped four American shooters, while Pernilla Winberg and Maria Rooth scored for Sweden. This was the first game in which any team other than Canada had beaten the United States, and made Sweden the first team outside the top two to advance to a major final. The final was not as close, with Canada pulling out to a 4–0 lead by the halfway mark. Still, earning silver medal was a significant accomplishment for the Swedish women.

Men's

Roster

Round-robin

Medal round

Quarterfinal

Semifinal

Final

Women's

Roster

Results

Round-robin

Medal round

Semifinal

Final

Snowboarding 

Thirteen snowboarders represented Sweden across the three events, but only one, Maria Danielsson, earned a top-ten finish, which Danielsson did in the women's snowboard cross.

Halfpipe

Note: In the final, the single best score from two runs is used to determine the ranking. A bracketed score indicates a run that wasn't counted.

Parallel GS

Key: '+ Time' represents a deficit; the brackets indicate the results of each run.

Snowboard Cross

Speed skating 

In the 1000 metres, Erik Zachrisson blocked Russia's Dmitry Dorofeyev, who was ahead of the pace of gold medalist Shani Davis at the time. Zachrisson ended up being disqualified.

Notes and references

Further reference
 2006 Team Book Sweden from the Swedish Olympic Committee, retrieved 22 January 2006.

Winter Olympics
Nations at the 2006 Winter Olympics
2006